Ludovic Dauș ( – November 17, 1954) was a Romanian novelist, playwright, poet and translator, also known for his contributions as a politician and theatrical manager. He was born into a cosmopolitan family, with a Czech father and a boyaress mother, but his formative years were marked by life in the small boroughs of Western Moldavia. Trained as a lawyer and employed for a while as a publisher, Dauș joined the body of experts at the Ministry of Royal Domains, climbing through the bureaucratic ranks. In parallel, he advanced his literary career: a noted dramatist, he was an unremarked poet and historical novelist prior to World War I. His translation work covered several languages, and includes Romanian versions of The Kreutzer Sonata, Madame Bovary, and Eugénie Grandet.

After being welcomed into the literary salon headed by Bogdan Petriceicu Hasdeu, Dauș moved between literary clubs. By 1918, he had adopted a Romanian nationalist discourse in his poetry and, increasingly, in his political career. He had several new commissions in Greater Romania, and in particular Bessarabia, where he is remembered as the first chairman of Chișinău National Theater. Dauș went on to serve in the Assembly of Deputies and Senate, where he affirmed the interests of Bessarabian peasants and advocated radical land reform; initially a member of the local Independent Party, he later caucused with the National Liberals.

During the interwar, Dauș was also loosely affiliated with the modernist circle Sburătorul. He matured as a writer, earning praise and drawing controversy with works of political fiction which bridged a neo-romantic subject matter with elements of the psychological novel; he also shocked theatergoers with his explicit play about Vlad Țepeș. He continued to work for the stage during World War II, and was briefly a manager of Caragiale Theater, dying shortly after the inauguration of a communist regime.

Biography

Early life and debut
Born in Botoșani, Ludovic was the son of Alfred Dauș (also Dausch, Dousa, Dușa, or Bouschek). An engineer of Czech ethnicity, he had been born at Dolní Lochov, Bohemia in 1845, and baptized a Catholic. Dauș Sr had settled in the United Principalities and taken up various activities in his field of expertise. According to various records, he had participated in the January Uprising, supporting the Polish National Government; other sources note that he had lived for a while in Ottoman Bosnia. In 1880, he helped establish an iron foundry for Botoșani's apprentice smiths. By 1897, he was Botoșani County's official surveyor, and, as a protégé of its Prefect, Ion Arapu, stood accused of having mistreated government employees working under his watch. Ludovic's mother was Maria Negri, a niece of the Moldavian writer Costache Negri, reportedly educated in Lviv. Through her, Dauș was a member of the boyar aristocracy.

The future writer was baptized into the Romanian Orthodox Church, to which his mother belonged. Though his father had been fully naturalized in February 1886, Ludovic only took Romanian citizenship in 1899. Attending the A. T. Laurian National College of Botoșani, he prepared for a career in the Romanian Land Forces, enlisting at the Military School of Iași, but disliked the conditions there and moved to Fălticeni. There, he studied for a while under Eugen Lovinescu, before returning to his home city, and finally to Bucharest, where he attended Sfântu Gheorghe High School—a private school managed by Anghel Demetriescu and George Ionescu-Gion. During the period, he had his very first poems appear in Ioniță Scipione Bădescu's Botoșani paper, Curierul Român. According to his own recollections, he was heavily inspired by the elegiac poetry of Vasile Alecsandri and Heinrich Heine. From such beginnings, he switched to writing "naive, stupid" works, including a dramatic poem "where the protagonist was the head of a decapitated man." Botoșani and Fălticeni, as prototypes of the Western Moldavian târg, would later form the backdrop for his prose, which includes specific allusions to his school years.

After taking his baccalaureate in June 1892, Dauș entered the civil service as a copyist at the Ministry of Royal Domains. In October 1895, the National Theater Bucharest took up his translation of François Coppée's Les Jacobites. Ioan Bacalbașa gave the play a poor review, noting that Dauș had spent his efforts on prosody rather than ensuring that the play was watchable. He subsequently earned a law degree from the University of Bucharest (1897) and practiced as a lawyer. While still pursuing his career in the national bureaucracy, Dauș entered the publishing business as co-manager of Alcaly publishers, coordinating their serial Biblioteca pentru toți; the nominal owner, Leon Alcaly, was illiterate.

Dauș married Margot Soutzo, of the Soutzos clan, then divorced and, in 1910, remarried to the Frenchwoman Ecaterina Thiéry. He continued to publish poetry, some of it in Bogdan Petriceicu Hasdeu's Revista Nouă—an "obscure", "entirely impersonal" endeavor, according to historian George Călinescu. He debuted as a translator in 1896, with Antoine François Prévost's Manon Lescaut, later publishing renditions of Molière (The Imaginary Invalid, 1906), Ivan Turgenev (The Duelist, 1907), Jonathan Swift (Gulliver's Travels, 1908), E. T. A. Hoffmann (Stories, 1909), Leo Tolstoy (The Kreutzer Sonata, 1909), and Arthur Conan Doyle (1909). During those years, as a protege of Ionescu-Gion's, he frequented Hasdeu's literary salon at Editura Socec, where he met and befriended the fellow poet and dramatist Haralamb Lecca.

Dauș followed up with more dramatic poems of his own, usually performed at the National Theater. The series began with plays inspired by Lithuanian history: Akmiutis, in 1898; and, in 1903, the five-act Eglà. This work earned him a prize from the Romanian Academy. In 1902, he returned with Patru săbii ("Four Swords"); followed in 1904 by Blestemul ("The Curse"); in 1906 by Doamna Oltea ("Lady Oltea"), dramatizing the lives of Prince Bogdan and Stephen the Great; and in 1912 by Cumpăna ("The Watershed"). Such works were alternated by novels and novellas: Străbunii ("The Forefathers", 1900); Dușmani ai Neamului ("Enemies of the Nation", 1904); Iluzii ("Illusions", 1908); Satana ("Satan", 1912). All these were panned by critic Ovid Crohmălniceanu, who sees Dauș's early career as "quite fecund, but producing only countless illegible works." Most were focused on the legendary period before and during the Founding of Moldavia.

Dauș became loosely affiliated with Literatorul magazine, which reunited Romanian Symbolists with poets who had left the Hasdeu circle. According to historian Nicolae Iorga, at that stage Dauș was still a "literary dilettante". His various works were by then carried by publications of many hues, including Familia, Luceafărul, Vatra, and Literatură și Știință. In Adevărul daily, he published several popular translations in feuilleton, using the pen name "Adrian Daria"; other pseudonyms he used for such work include "Adina G." and "Ludovic D." (the latter used for George Ranetti's Zeflemeaua). In 1894, and again in 1897, he and poet Radu D. Rosetti published the literary weekly Doina, named after the singing style. For a while in 1903, with Emil Conduratu, he put out another magazine, Ilustrațiunea Română ("Romanian Illustration").

World War I and Bessarabia
A secretary of the prototype Romanian Writers' Society during its first meetings of 1908, Dauș cut off his links with the Literatorul circle. In 1912, he was writing for Floare Albastră, the anti-Symbolist review put out at Iași by A. L. Zissu. From 1914, he became a legal expert for the common land department of the Domains Ministry. Dauș also returned with poetry volume, În zări de foc ("Toward Fiery Horizons"), which came out in 1915, and with translations of Gustave Flaubert—Salammbô in 1913, Madame Bovary in 1915. He is hailed by some scholars as Romania's best Flaubertian translator.

In late 1916, Romania entered World War I, but was invaded by the Central Powers. In October 1916, his poem honoring the dead of Turtucaia was hosted in Viitorul newspaper and then in George Coșbuc's Albina. With Bucharest occupied by the Germans, Dauș fled to Iași, where the Romanian administration had relocated. During that time, he translated stories by the Countess of Ségur. Late in the war, his career became focused on Bessarabia, which had recently united with Romania, and he served as founding director (from 1918) of the Chișinău National Theater. He declared himself especially impressed by the "superstitious" religiousness and aristocratic dignity of Bessarabian peasants, becoming a champion of their case. In 1920, some of his new poetry was hosted in the local journal, Vulturul Basarabean.

During his stays in Bucharest, Dauș began frequenting with the modernist salon Sburătorul from its inception in 1919 and also published with regularity in the eponymous magazine. However, according to colleague I. Peltz, he was only welcomed there with "kind condescension" by the Sburătorul house critic, Eugen Lovinescu. Within this society, Dauș mainly associated with older figures, including Alexandru Văitoianu and Hortensia Papadat-Bengescu. This positioning also reflected Lovinescu's verdicts: he describes Dauș as a neo-romantic in the proximity of Sămănătorul traditionalism.

Active politically, Dauș joined the minor Independent Party of Bessarabia, established by Iustin Frățiman, Sergiu Niță, and Constantin Stere, running on its lists during the election of November 1919. He went on to serve in Greater Romania's Assembly of Deputies and Senate, attending Inter-Parliamentary Union conferences. He favored a radical land reform that reflected Socialist-Revolutionary influence, excoriating the Bessarabian Peasants' Party for moderating such promises, and singling out Ion Buzdugan and Ion Inculeț as traitors of the peasants. Rallying with the National Liberal Party, and serving in the Senate during the 1922–1926 legislature, Dauș spoke out for Bessarabian and nationalist causes. Noting the hostile Romanian–Soviet relations, he favored annexing the Moldavian ASSR to Greater Romania. In September 1926, his connections with Bessarabia were severed, as Ion Livescu took over his managerial position at the region's National Theater. The troupe protested at the time, demanding that Dauș be reinstated.

Dauș was also director of the State Press, president of the Romanian Athenaeum and of the Bessarabian Press Association, and eventually deputy director of the Romanian Radio Broadcasting Company. He returned to publishing first as a poet, with the 1919 Valea Albă ("White Valley")—a dramatic poem about the eponymous battle of 1476; and the 1924 Drumul sângelui ("Trail of Blood"). The latter was an homage to the soldiers dead at Mărășești and elsewhere on the Romanian front. Dauș's translations of verse drama included Victor Hugo Le roi s'amuse and William Shakespeare's King Lear (both 1924). He continued in that field with a new play centered on, and named after, Vlad Țepeș, performed at the Bucharest National Theater and published in 1930. It earned notoriety and disgust with its depictions of medieval cruelty, including impalement and death by boiling; reviewer Mihail Sevastos sarcastically noted that Dauș only "stopped short of cutting off the actresses' breasts" and never dramatized Vlad's alleged raping by Mehmed the Conqueror. Also according to Sevastos, the play was political theater, urging for the return of a Vlad-like dictator.

Literary prominence and later life
Dauș's interwar prose drew more attention, and is generally seen as much more accomplished than his earlier output. According to Crohmălniceanu, his novels of the 1920s and '30s were "interesting, commendable for their social observation", with "an actual writer's skill." According to Lovinescu, Dauș only discovered his literary point of view "at the age when most others lose theirs." The series includes 1927's Drăceasca schimbare de piele ("A Devilish Shedding of the Skin"), in which a middle-aged woman embraces marital infidelity, then insanity, as she changes into the clothes of a courtesan. Among the reviewers of the time, Constantin Șăineanu was largely unimpressed, reading Drăceasca schimbare... as an implausible "exceptional, abnormal, sickly case, to be addressed by medical clinics." The eroticized episodes, Șăineanu argues, "are supposed to pass for action." Published in 1932, Asfințit de oameni ("A Dimming of Men") documented the decline of boyardom, replaced by "a social mix of Levantines", depicted "with remarkable objectivity and astuteness". As noted by Călinescu, the upstart and murderer Vangheli Zionis, originally the antagonist, appears more likeable by the end of the book, when he is contrasted with the sadistic boyaress Nathalie Dragnea. Based on "romanticized historical truth", the novel is "not entirely transfigured by art". Highlighting its narrative of class conflict, Lovinescu sees the novel as a revamped Sămănătorist work, but "solid, realistic, honest", and "without romantic rhetoric."

A final novel, titled O jumătate de om ("Half a Man"), came out in 1937. Dauș personally presented this work, published by Adevărul, to Iorga, believing that the historian and critic would be pleased. Iorga instead panned it, being outraged by the alternation of "banal observations" and "revolting" details of love affairs, including "those parts of the body that humans cover up in their effort to seem less like dogs." Noted by Crohmălniceanu for its "ingenious intrigue" and its "nervous" writing, O jumătate de om follows the submissive and exploitable Traian Belciu through a series of existential failures. These culminate with him being swept up by the world war, dragged into Germanophile circles, and ultimately shot as a deserter. It is, in Lovinescu's view, the best book by Dauș—accomplished as a work of political fiction, but largely failed as a psychological novel, and out of step with modernism. According to Iorga, Dauș made no effort to conceal that some of the characters in the book were identifiable among the intellectual class of Botoșani.

In tandem with this controversy, Dauș's activity as a translator expanded to cover works by Honoré de Balzac (a version of Eugénie Grandet came out in 1935). His parallel translations from Heine were put to music by the Transylvanian Emil Monția. Having been awarded the Romanian Writers' Society prize in 1938, the following year he put out memoirs in the magazine Jurnalul Literar. That year, answering Gherman Pântea's invitation, he also returned to Bessarabia to unveil a monument honoring Ferdinand I of Romania, using the occasion to reinforce unionist sentiment with a patriotic speech. As an associate of Victor Dombrovski, the Mayor of Bucharest, Dauș helped organize the June 1939 commemoration of Mihai Eminescu, Romania's national poet, to whom he dedicated several speeches and poems. His final works, published during World War II, were the play Ioana (1942) and the novella collection Porunca toamnei ("Autumn Commands", 1943). The former was performed at Bucharest's Studio Theater, and had considerable success. It contrasted the eponymous female hero with a decadent bourgeois society.

Following King Michael's Coup in August 1944, with Dombrovski returning as Mayor, Dauș was made co-director of Caragiale Theater, sharing this distinction with actor Ion Manolescu and producer Sică Alexandrescu. He lived to see the first years of Romanian communist rule, dying in Bucharest and being buried at Colentina cemetery. Some confusion persists as to his date of death, as some sources have 1953; the most precise accounts indicate that he died on November 17, 1954, and was laid to rest two days after.

He left various manuscripts, including a verse chronicle of World War II, titled Anii cerniți ("Years of Mourning"), and the unfinished novel Răscruci ("Junctions"). At least three other notebooks of his own poetry, and an "impressive number" of poetry translations (notably, from Charles Baudelaire, Alexander Pushkin, and Paul Verlaine), all remain unpublished. He was survived by his widow Ecaterina Thiéry-Dauș, who donated his papers and her own memoirs of their life together to the National Archives fund in Botoșani. In 1977, critic Valentin Tașcu noted that the "solid tradition of Romanian historical prose" included Mihail Sadoveanu, Camil Petrescu, Liviu Rebreanu, "and even Ludovic Dauș." As argued by scholar Iurie Colesnic, while dismissed as a "mediocre" writer and "almost forgotten" in Romania, Dauș is still regarded as a "legendary figure" among the Romanians of Bessarabia—in particular, in the present-day Republic of Moldova.

Notes

References
George Călinescu, Istoria literaturii române de la origini pînă în prezent. Bucharest: Editura Minerva, 1986.
Iurie Colesnic, Chișinăul din inima noastră. Chișinău: B. P. Hașdeu Library, 2014.  
Ovid Crohmălniceanu, Literatura română între cele două războaie mondiale, Vol. I. Bucharest: Editura Minerva, 1972.  
Maria Gancevici, "Contribuții la viața și opera lui Ludovic Dauș", in Hierasus, Vol. II, 1979, pp. 364–369.
Nicolae Iorga, 
Istoria literaturii românești contemporane. II: În căutarea fondului (1890–1934). Bucharest: Editura Adevĕrul, 1934.
"Inca un molipsit: d. Ludovic Dauș", in Cuget Clar, Vol. I, 1936–1937, pp. 625–626.
Eugen Lovinescu, Istoria literaturii române contemporane. Chișinău: Editura Litera, 1998. 
Iosif E. Naghiu, "Contribuții la biografia lui Ludovic Dauș (1873—1954)", in Hierasus. Anuar '78, Part I, pp. 527–532.
I. Peltz, Amintiri din viața literară. Bucharest: Cartea Românească, 1974.  
Constantin Șăineanu, Noui recenzii: 1926–1929. Bucharest: Editura Adevĕrul, 1930.  

1873 births
1954 deaths
Romanian historical novelists
Psychological fiction writers
Romanian erotica writers
Romanian male short story writers
Romanian short story writers
Romanian poets
Romanian dramatists and playwrights
Romanian theatre managers and producers
Romanian translators
French–Romanian translators
English–Romanian translators
Russian–Romanian translators
Translators of Alexander Pushkin
Translators of William Shakespeare
Translators of Leo Tolstoy
Romanian book publishers (people)
Adevărul writers
Romanian magazine founders
Romanian magazine editors
20th-century Romanian lawyers
Romanian civil servants
Romanian nationalists
Romanian agrarianists
National Liberal Party (Romania) politicians
Members of the Chamber of Deputies (Romania)
Members of the Senate of Romania
People from Botoșani
Romanian people of Czech descent
Members of the Romanian Orthodox Church
Naturalised citizens of Romania
Romanian nobility
University of Bucharest alumni
Romanian World War I poets
Romanian people of World War II